Goldie Hill (January 11, 1933 – February 24, 2005), born Argolda Voncile Hill, was an American country music singer. She was one of the first women in country music, and became one of the first women to reach the top of the country music charts with her No. 1 1953 hit, "I Let the Stars Get In My Eyes". Along with Kitty Wells and Jean Shepard she helped set the standard for later women in country music.

Early life and career
Hill was born in Karnes City, Texas in 1933, a small town southeast of San Antonio. She was the sister of singer Tommy Hill. She also performed with her brothers Tommy and Ken. Then she auditioned as a solo singer at Decca Records. Her first single, "Why Talk To My Heart", was released in 1952.  Hill recorded the song "I Let the Stars Get In My Eyes" the same year a riposte to Perry Como's "Don't Let The Stars Get In Your Eyes", written by her brother, Tommy Hill. It became a number 1 hit. In 1954, she followed up with two hit duets with singer Justin Tubb, son of Ernest Tubb. In the early 1960s, she recorded two albums for Decca Records. She regularly performed on Louisiana Hayride, Grand Ole Opry and Ozark Jubilee. She married country singer Carl Smith in 1957 and the couple had two sons (Carl, Jr. and Larry Dean), and one daughter (Lori Lynn). They remained married for 47 years until her death. She made a short-lived comeback in the late 1960s with the label Epic Records under the name Goldie Hill Smith. On February 24, 2005, Hill died from complications of cancer. She was 72 years old. Her husband survived her by 5 years.

Discography

Albums

Singles

Further reading
 Country Music:The Rough Guide, Author: Kurt Wolff

Notes

External links

 CMT.com: Goldie Hill
 Goldie Hill Dies at Age 72 at Nucountry.com
 Goldie Hill recordings at the Discography of American Historical Recordings.
 

1933 births
2005 deaths
American country guitarists
American women country singers
American country singer-songwriters
People from Karnes City, Texas
Grand Ole Opry members
Deaths from cancer in Tennessee
20th-century American singers
20th-century American guitarists
Singer-songwriters from Texas
Guitarists from Texas
20th-century American women singers
Country musicians from Texas
20th-century American women guitarists
21st-century American women